The Formula One Monaco Grand Prix has had a support race in many of its editions, the longest running of which was the Monaco Grand Prix Formula Three, held each year from 1964 to 1997, and again in 2005. It replaced the Monaco Grand Prix Formula Junior. The Formula Three race was replaced by Formula 3000 for 1998, which would then become the GP2 Series and then the Formula 2.

The Coupe Prince Ranier was held once in the 1930s, and the Prix de Monte Carlo held twice in the 1950s.

History

Coupe Prince Ranier
The first support race for the Monaco Grand Prix was held in 1936 as a race for 1.5 litre voiturettes, and was won by Prince Bira in an ERA. The Coupe Prince Ranier was repeated the next year but for sports cars instead, won by Laury Schell in a Delahaye. With the Monaco Grand Prix not held in 1938 and the interruption of World War 2, the Coupe Prince Ranier was not held again.

Prix de Monte Carlo
After the first Monaco Grand Prix after the War in 1948, a motorcycle race was held, but this was never repeated. At the next Monaco Grand Prix, in 1950, was the first Prix de Monaco held for 500cc Formula Three cars, and was won by Stirling Moss. After another one-year hiatus the Monaco Grand Prix returned in 1952 now as a sports car race, with the Prix de Monte Carlo held for sports cars up to 2 litres. The Monaco Grand Prix was placed on hiatus again until 1955, but the Prix de Monte Carlo would not return.

Monaco Grand Prix Formula Junior/Monaco Grand Prix Formula Three
The race became a permanent event first as a Formula Junior race in 1959. Formula Junior was replaced by Formula Two and Formula Three in 1964 and the support race was now held with Formula Three cars. A European Formula Three Championship was introduced in 1974 but the Monaco race was not part of it and instead attracted drivers from the various national and international F3 series held in Europe.

After the end of the European Championship it was one of the two unofficial European F3 races along with the Masters of Formula 3. The F3 race was cancelled after 1997. The F3 race was resurrected once again in 2005 as a part of the Formula Three Euroseries, but this championship never returned as it had mostly followed the DTM calendar.

Three drivers have won the Monaco Grand Prix Formula Three support race twice: Peter Arundell for Lotus in 1961 and 1962, Alain Ferté for Oreca in 1981 and 1982 and Gianantonio Pacchioni for Tatuus in 1993 and Prema Powerteam in 1995.

The most successful team in the event is Oreca, who have won the event six times: Alain Ferté in 1981 and 1982, Michel Ferté in 1983, Pierre-Henri Raphanel in 1985, Yannick Dalmas in 1986 and Laurent Aïello in 1990. The next most successful is Martini with four wins (1973, 1977, 1979 and 1980), while Lotus have three (1961, 1962 and 1971). Matra, Prema Powerteam and Bertram Schäfer Racing each have two wins.

Martini chassis won the event ten times between 1973 and 1986, the most of any manufacturer. Dallara have taken eight victories since 1988, while Lotus have four, Cooper have three, and Matra, Tecno, March, Ralt and Reynard all have two.

Formula 3000/GP2/Formula 2
Formula Three was replaced by an International Formula 3000 race in 1998. This was held until 2004, with Formula 3000 replaced by the GP2 Series in 2005.

Other races
Formula Renault has held rounds at the Monaco Grand Prix since 2003, first with the Formula Renault V6 Eurocup, which was replaced by the Formula Renault 3.5 Series from 2005-2015. More recently the more junior 2 litre Formula Renault series have held races at Monaco. In 2021 this was rebranded as the Formula Regional European Championship by Alpine.

The GP3 Series made a one-off appearance in 2012.

The Porsche Supercup has supported all Monaco Grands Prix since its inception in 1993.

Winners

Coupe Prince Ranier

Prix de Monte Carlo

Monaco Grand Prix Formula Three (and Formula Junior)
Note: A pink background denotes a Formula Junior race.

International Formula 3000 Championship

GP2 Series

FIA Formula 2 Championship

See also 
Monaco race results

Notes

References

Formula Three support race
Formula Three races